Clive Anthony Clark (born 27 June 1945) is an English professional golfer and more recently a broadcaster and golf course architect.

Early life and amateur career
Clark started playing golf at the age of 12. He was a Junior Member at both Scarborough North Cliff and Ganton, both golf clubs being in Yorkshire, England. His dedication to the sport resulted in early success, being runner-up in The Boys' Championship and in successive years was Captain of the British Boys' Team against Europe, and later Captained The English Youth's Team vs Scotland. He progressed in his late teens to be successful in major Amateur Championships. Clive was a winner of The Brabazon Trophy (The English Amateur Strokeplay), the 72-hole Lytham Trophy, and The Golf Illustrated Gold Vase played at Sunningdale. In the same year, he was also runner-up to Michael Bonallack in both The British Amateur Championship and The English Amateur Championship. On turning 20, Clark played in The Walker Cup in Baltimore, Maryland (USA) where he was undefeated in his four matches, and in the last match out on the course, he holed a 33-foot putt on the last green for Great Britain to tie the USA.

Professional career
Clark then turned Professional in 1965 at the age of 20 and won The Danish Open in 1966. In 1968 he won the Agfacolor Film Tournament and the Bowmaker Tournament. In 1970 he won the John Player Trophy, a 36-hole event which acted a qualifier for the John Player Classic. In 1974, playing with Peter Butler, he won the Sumrie-Bournemouth Better-Ball. Clark's best finish in a Major was in 1967 when he tied for 3rd place with Gary Player in The Open Championship at Hoylake behind Jack Nicklaus and the winner, Roberto de Vicenzo. He was also runner-up in the British PGA Championship, The French Open and lost a play-off to Gary Player in The Spanish Classic.

Broadcasting
After his long career in professional golf, Clark spent 18 years as a golf commentator for BBC Television alongside Peter Alliss. During that period, he also worked on several occasions for CBS Television on The Masters in Augusta. He was also an announcer for The Australian Open (for the Australian Broadcasting Company) and The Million Dollar Challenge in South Africa (for the South African Broadcasting Corporation).

Golf course architect
Clark and Peter Alliss formed their own golf course design company in the mid 1980s. Some of their work included Alcaidesa (just outside Sotogrande in Spain), Pyrford Golf Club (in Surrey, England) and Castle Combe (in the Cotswolds area of northwest Wiltshire in England). In the mid 1990s, Clark formed his own golf course design company, Clive Clark Design, which is located in La Quinta, California. The company has won many national and international awards for their design work. Clark's designs include Dumbarnie Links, Lake Winnipesaukee, Belgrade Lakes, The Hideaway, Celebrity Course at Indian Wells Resort and Eagle Falls.

Amateur wins
1965 Brabazon Trophy (3-way tie), Lytham Trophy (tie with Michael Bonallack), Golf Illustrated Gold Vase

Professional wins (5)
this list may be incomplete
1966 Danish Open
1968 Agfacolor Film Tournament, Bowmaker Tournament
1970 John Player Trophy
1974 Sumrie-Bournemouth Better-Ball (with Peter Butler)

Playoff record
European Tour playoff record (0–1)

Results in major championships

Note: Clark only played in the Masters Tournament and The Open Championship.

CUT = missed the half-way cut (3rd round cut in 1968, 1971 and 1974 Open Championships)
"T" indicates a tie for a place

Team appearances
Amateur
Walker Cup (representing Great Britain & Ireland): 1965 (tied)
St Andrews Trophy (representing Great Britain & Ireland): 1964 (winners)
European Amateur Team Championship (representing England): 1965

Professional
Ryder Cup (representing Great Britain & Ireland): 1973

See also 
 Spring 1968 PGA Tour Qualifying School graduates

References

External links

English male golfers
European Tour golfers
Ryder Cup competitors for Europe
Golf course architects
Golf writers and broadcasters
Sportspeople from Winchester
Sportspeople from Scarborough, North Yorkshire
People educated at Scarborough High School for Boys
1945 births
Living people